Adam Barrington Spencer (born 29 January 1969) is an Australian comedian, media personality and former radio presenter. He first came to fame when he won his round of the comedic talent search Raw Comedy in 1996. Soon thereafter, he began working at Triple J, on mid-dawn and drive shifts before hosting the Triple J Breakfast Show with Wil Anderson. He later hosted Breakfast on 702 ABC Sydney.

He is a patron of science-related events and programs, including the University of Sydney's Sleek Geeks Science Prize (category in the Eureka Prize). He collaborated with Karl Kruszelnicki for the long-running Sleek Geek Week tour (as part of National Science Week). He hosts events and panels, writes mathematical recreation books, and performs his own comedy at events around the country.

He is a supporter of the Australian rules football team, the Sydney Swans, and was declared their number one ticket holder for the 2016 season.

Early life 
Born on 29 January 1969, in Sydney, Spencer grew up in the Hunters Hill/Gladesville area.

A few hours after birth, he had a seizure, and doctors found blood between his brain and scalp. Twice in the first two days of his life, a priest was called to give the last rites. Between the ages of three until about 11, Spencer underwent a series of operations by eye surgeon Fred Hollows. The deadening of the eyelid muscle led to permanent ptosis (drooping of the upper eyelid) and noticeable facial asymmetry. He later received a transplant from a donor (who had been in a motorcycle accident) in an operation, allowing him to "open" that eye.

His father Larry, died from prostate cancer in 2004. He has a brother and a sister.

Spencer attended Boronia Park Public School, where his favourite teacher, Ms Russell, encouraged his love of mathematics when he was in second grade, in 1976. In 1981 he won a scholarship to attend St Aloysius' College in Sydney, and was a vice-captain of the College and Captain of the Australian Schools Debating Team. He graduated with a score of 200 out of 200 in four-unit maths.

His earliest job was selling newspapers, and during university worked as a dishwasher at a pancake restaurant. He was a member of Scouts Australia.

Spencer was the first in his family to attend university, and originally enrolled to study arts-law. This included economics and philosophy, but he dropped out of those, taking up maths to "round it out", but eventually changed to a maths major. He graduated from the University of Sydney with a Bachelor of Science with first class honours in pure mathematics in 1991, residing at St Paul's College during his time there. While at university, he was one of the world's top-ranked debaters, reaching the final round of the World Universities Debating Championship three times (1990, 1992, 1996) and winning World's Best Individual Speaker (1996). He won the Australasian debating championship twice (1988, 1990). He was President of the University of Sydney Union.

Career 

He was secretly entered into the Triple J Raw Comedy Championship in 1996 by a former girlfriend, and won the NSW championship (although this has also been reported as winning the second prize, as he came second in the national competition).

Television 
Spencer has been a host of ABC science shows Quantum, FAQ and Sleek Geeks. He was a regular guest on the O'Loghlin variety comedy show since its first episode in June 1999.

In October 2001, he hosted the Visions for a Nation Federation Forum. This focused on the views of leading Australians about the challenges facing Australia in the 21st century. It later screened on the ABC.

In August 2002, he made a guest appearance on Cheez TV (Channel Ten), playing a burglar with an aversion to old Wham! songs.

Radio 
Spencer was spotted by radio station Triple J's senior broadcaster, Helen Razer, at the 1996 Raw Comedy Finals, when he provided a live impromptu weather segment involving mathematical equations. This approach to presenting maths via the weather has been noted by other mathematicians.

He was invited to do occasional work at Triple J, and then hosted segments during the midnight-to-dawn shifts. He did guest spots entitled "Bloking up" on Razer and Judith Lucy's Ladies Lounge afternoon show. When Lucy left Triple J for Melbourne's FOX-FM, he joined as co-host of the Departure Lounge. Helen Razer left in 1998. In 1999, Spencer was later promoted to solo hosting of the breakfast show for approximately 18 months.

Wil Anderson joined Triple J in April 1999, beginning their co-hosting of the breakfast show. The highest-number of mathematical references made by Spencer on an episode the show was 32 instances on 7 March 2001. In 2002, Anderson and Spencer created a fictional metal band, Salmon Hater, with a single 6.66 - One Hundredth of the Number of the Beast. It was rated as number 26 in Triple J's Hottest 100.

Both Anderson and Spencer chose to retire from the breakfast show in 2004. They hosted a comedic tribute show, The Last Time, which toured around Australia and focused on their six years in co-hosting the show. The tribute show's title was a mocking take on John Farnham's farewell tour, which was not actually his last tour.

On 20 February 2006, he began presenting Breakfast on 702 ABC Sydney, replacing Angela Catterns. His hosting was described as having transformed ABC 702 into a "...science and maths, women's sports and soft rock loving place to be..." On 6 December 2013, Spencer hosted his last breakfast radio program for ABC 702, concluding 14 years of radio broadcasting at the age of 44. His farewell live show included Alex Lloyd performing a rewritten version of his song Amazing. For his final radio survey, Spencer was ranked second in the breakfast slot. He was replaced on ABC 702 by fellow Triple J alumni, Robbie Buck.

Spencer hosted the Smile High Club radio show programme on Qantas Airlines radio channel, Q, circa 2010.

Presentations and hosting 

Spencer has hosted science-related events and held guest spots at a wide range of festivals and conferences, and has been described as "the Eddie McGuire of edgy cultural events."

Spencer was interviewed about issues affecting teens, for George Negus' New Dimensions' special screenings during Youth Week in 2003.

He went through Channel 7's Wheel of Fortune's formal audition process in April 2004. He then played on the show in June 2004. He became a carry-over champion and won a telescope.

For several years, Spencer has hosted both the Eureka awards and the Prime Minister's Prizes for Science award ceremonies. The Eureka awards have included a sponsored namesake award: the online Adam Spencer/University of Sydney Eureka Schools Prize for Lateral Thinking. The namesake award was issued in 2003 and 2004.

Spencer has presented televised coverage of Tropfest for a number of years, including 2006 and 2013.

He interviewed Breaking Bad scriptwriter Vince Gilligan during the Sydney Writers' Festival in 2014.

Controversies and criticism

Publications

Books 
Spencer has written several mathematical recreation books.

Articles 
In August 2002, Spencer provided commentary in an ABC online article about the interpretation of the AKS algorithm.

Compilation CD trilogy 
The ABC published a trilogy of compilation CDs of Adam Spencer's breakfast music. The CD series was issued under the Mytunes series name (distinct from the MyTunes program used to circumvent iTunes restrictions). They included Mytunes (2011), Mytunes 2 (2012) and Mytunes 3 (2013).

Interviews

Guest book chapters 
Spencer was interviewed about how to have a safe and happy sex life, for Julie McCrossin's book, Love, Lust and Latex (2000).

He was interviewed for a chapter on prelabour in Lucy Perry's book, Cheers to childbirth: a dad's guide to childbirth support (2010)

Television episode 
Spencer and producer Jo Chichester were interviewed for episode nine of ABC's television series Artzone in 1999.

Personal life 
Spencer was prompted to lose 25 kilograms in 2000, at the behest of his then-girlfriend.

He met his now ex-wife Melanie Mossman at a pub trivia night, telling her an answer in the quiz ("The actor is George Clooney and the film is Solaris.").

On the final day of his breakfast show in November 2004, he announced that his partner Melanie Mossman was pregnant and that the next year he would be leaving his media career to become a full-time dad. He returned within two years to present another breakfast radio show. He married Mel on 28 January 2006 in the Great Hall at Sydney University, where guests were asked to donate to charities in lieu of gifts. They have two daughters. When his oldest daughter was six months old, Spencer donated money for a fly to be named after her, Fijian fly A. Amblypsilopus elaquarae (Elaquare's Amblypsilopus). This was through the Australian Museum's project to seek funding by giving new animal species namesakes for a donation.

In 2014, thieves broke into Spencer's family home in Newtown, taking valuables including a laptop containing photos of his daughter. His car was also stolen, and was later found crashed into a power pole in Victoria Street, Marrickville. In 2015 Spencer, Mossman and their children moved to Copacabana, and listed the Newtown property for auction in August 2016.

In August 2017, Spencer confirmed he and Mossman had separated in early 2015 and been divorced for some time.

While Spencer attended St. Aloysius' College and was brought up a Catholic, he describes himself an atheist.

Cycling 
Spencer has participated in cycling events in Sydney for charity. In March 2001, he led the cyclist portion of Oxfam Community Aid Abroad's Walk Against Want Victoria Park Fundraiser. He gave a presentation on the importance of planning for cyclists at the PIA 2003 National Congress. In November 2003, he took part in the cycling City to Surf, which fundraised for people in NSW with multiple sclerosis. In February 2004, he launched the new Central Sydney Bicycle map, which shares information on the easiest ways to cycle around Sydney. In May 2005, as part of the Greenhouse Advisory Panel, he advocated for car registration fees to link with engine size, to help people focus on their greenhouse impact and environmental footprint. He agrees with Danish urban planner's blueprint for a better Sydney, commenting in 2007 that pedestrian access should be improved in the heart of Sydney, including marked lanes for cyclists. He had made similar cycle lane commentary in April 2003 for an article about what he would institute if he were City of Sydney's Lord Mayor. For the first day of hosting breakfast for ABC 702, he cycled 4 kilometres to work for his 5:30am shift. He is often spotted around Sydney, pedalling or wearing his bike helmet and cycling clothes.

Football 
Spencer took part in a celebrity game of football in June 2003, May 2004, and May 2005, to fundraise for the Malcolm Sargent Cancer Fund for Children (now Redkite).

Sydney Swans 
In April 2006, he was master of ceremonies during a corporate function held before the Sydney Swans versus Geelong match. In March 2009, he MC'd a cocktail party for the Swans Foundation, which offers a scholarship scheme. In May 2012, he was master of ceremonies for the Swans Ladies Lunch.

In June 2012, to commemorate the Swans' 30 years in Sydney, he wrote for the Daily Telegraph about his ideal Swans team list.

In October 2015 he was named as the number one ticket holder for the Sydney Swans for the 2016 season.

In July 2017, as master of ceremonies, Spencer launched the Sydney Swans' Diversity Action Plan The plan is focused on disability empowerment, LGBTIQ pride, multicultural inclusion, and advancement of women.

Political views and activities 
In 1992, Spencer spoke at the constitutional monarchists' attack on the Australian Republican Movement, at the University.

In the 1996 by-election, while he was a student and part-time mathematics teacher at Sydney University, Spencer ran as an independent candidate. He was with the Anti-Super League Party (ASLeeP) or Australians Against Further Super League party, competing for Paul Keating's seat of Blaxland. The party received 499 votes.

In November 2000, an article in the satirical Chaser newspaper alleged that Spencer refused to play a song by Little Johnny (pseudonym of Pauline Pantsdown), because of his "conservative leanings".

In 2014, Spencer spoke out against the government's proposed funding cuts to the ABC, and accused politicians of hiding loathing for the broadcaster behind arguments around inefficiencies.

In 2015, he was one of 61 prominent Australians who signed an open letter urging the Prime Minister to call a moratorium on new coal mines as part of a global climate change agreement.

Community, charity and advocacy work

Representative roles 
Spencer is an ambassador for The Fred Hollows Foundation.

He is the national Patron for Dry July, having supported the cause ever since it began, prompted by a phone call to his breakfast radio show in 2007.

He is on the board of directors of Redkite (formerly The Malcolm Sargent Cancer Fund for kids).

General contributions 
He coached the University of Sydney second grade women's football team. Since December 2001, he has been a Fellow of the University Senate. He had also served a term from 1992 to 1995. He is a member of the NSW Premier's Advisory Committee on Greenhouse and Global Warming and the NSW Health Department's Clinical Ethics Review Committee. He was part of the assessment panel for the NSW Medical Devices Fund in 2014.

In June 1999, he supported senator Natasha Stott Despoja's stand against the GST package, providing a poem to be read out at a function at Adelaide's Stag Hotel.

He sought corporate sponsorship to help the Australian Chess Team, issuing a national plea in 2002. The request was a success, and the team were able to attend the 35th Chess Olympiad in Bled, Slovenia, with financial help from condom maker Ansell.

Spencer took part in the Starlight Cup in October 2002 (sponsored by Hewlett-Packard) and December 2003 (sponsored by Qantas), wherein former tennis greats competing against celebrities.

In 2004, Spencer was on the judging panel for the Out of Sight - Tactile Art exhibition, run by Object Gallery and the Royal Blind Society.

He promoted pharmacy careers in an advertising campaign for the Pharmacy Guild of Australia in 2002, 2003 and 2004. The 2002 campaign was linked with the Rural and Remote Pharmacy Workforce Development Program. The 2003 campaign aimed to encourage young indigenous people to consider a career in pharmacy through the Aboriginal and Torres Strait Islander Undergraduate Pharmacy scholarships. The 2004 campaign aimed to attract young people from rural and regional centres to enrol in pharmacy university courses. He promoted the campaign in a television commercial in around 2006.

In August 2005, he hosted a corporate quiz fundraiser for Redkite in Brisbane.

In November 2005, he was one of the celebrity judges rating moustaches for the Movember Gala Party in Sydney. The campaign raised funds for the Prostate Cancer Foundation of Australia. He grew a moustache for Movember in 2006.

Spencer was part of the language expert panel for the Australian subsidiary developing the 2007 Microsoft Office System.

He was the Australia Day Ambassador in 2008.

In 2010, he featured in advertisements for the Prostate Cancer Foundation of Australia. The campaign focused on providing men with advice on prostate cancer and encouraged them to investigate testing options.

In 2010, Spencer signed up as one of the Ambassadors for White Ribbon, taking part in a swearing-in ceremony. In 2011, his show promoted the White Ribbon campaign against violence towards women. This contrasted with the coverage on 2Day FM of Kyle Sandilands lambasting the appearance of entertainment writer Alison Stephenson. Spencer told his radio audience that he regarded Sandilands' remarks as "heinous".

He hosted the Pink Stumps cricket day in support of the Jane McGrath Foundation in 2012. That same year, he was team captain of the Sydney Sailors in the Community Cup in Sydney, who won the match. The annual day raises funds for Reclink Australia.

In 2014, he participated in a video for Reach Out, focusing on combating stress during exams). He highlighted his change in studies (from law to mathematics), and eventual radio role, as examples of changing direction and life path.

Spencer was one of the celebrities credited with promoting the #SPCsunday hashtag on Twitter in 2014, which helped to increase exposure for struggling food processor SPC Ardmona.

Science, literacy and educational reforms 
Spencer has advocated for better science literacy through educational reforms and improved resourcing for science teachers and laboratories in Australian primary schools. He has also urged high school students to do mathematics subjects to improve university outcomes and Australia's development. Spencer has highlighted the perceived failings of the Australian Tertiary Admissions Rank (ATAR), in terms of how subjects are weighted, and impact the final rankings for students. He has supported National Literacy and Numeracy Week by being a surprise visiting mathematics teacher. Lurnea High School was the winning school for his guest teaching spot in 2004.

In 2002, he was one of the suspects in the scientific whodunnit, "Who stole the Minister's malibu?", a forensic science program held across schools nationally.

In 2010 Spencer donated $10,000 worth of books through the Dymocks Literacy Foundation to encourage children from non-English speaking backgrounds to learn to read and write in English. The donation was for students at Blaxcell Street Public School (Granville), where he had been "Principal for a Day" in 2006.

In 2012, Spencer gave a book to each student at La Perouse Public School. This was to launch The Book Bank Project (partly funded by Spencer) and the National Year of Reading. In 2013, he was listed as an ambassador for The Book Bank program.

In 2013, he signed the "And in Science..." petition, which called for a science section during Australian television and radio news broadcasts. The campaign was organised by Rohan Kapitany, and gathered over 2300 signatures, but it was ultimately unsuccessful.

In 2016, he was a Numeracy Ambassador for National Literacy and Numeracy Week. He hosted a maths workshop at Gosford High School.

On the eve of the global March for Science (April 2017), Spencer, along with 44 other public figures and members of the scientific community, signed a letter in support of international scientific endeavour.

Recognition 

In 2012, Main-belt asteroid 18413 Adamspencer was named after him.

In 2012, he was ranked 49th in the Weekend Australians list of "Top 50 most influential in higher education".

On 3 February 2018, Spencer was awarded an honorary Doctor of Science honoris causa award by Edith Cowan University.

Portraits 
In 2002, photographer Lisa Giles included Spencer in a collection of 50 portraits in the exhibition Schools of Thought, focused on people associated with the University of Sydney. In the same year, artist Nafisa Naomi painted a portrait of Spencer, which featured in the exhibition A Lingering Doubt at the ArtHouse Hotel.

In 2005, National Library of Australia staff member Greg Power photographed Spencer at the fundraising Wave Aid: the tsunami relief concert. The image has been included in the National Library's collection.

In 2010, artist Melissa Beowulf entered her portrait of Spencer in the Portia Geach Memorial Award, which reached the finals. Spencer has commented on his "stern pose" in the painting.

In 2014, photographer David Stefanoff selected Spencer as one of a selection of famous faces projected onto trees and landscapes.

References

External links 

 Spencer's website
 Spencer's profile on ABC
 
 
 "Why I fell in love with monster prime numbers" (TED2013)

1969 births
Living people
Australian male comedians
Mathematics education
Australian DJs
Triple J announcers
Radio in Sydney
Australian soccer coaches
Australian people with disabilities
University of Sydney alumni
People educated at St Aloysius' College (Sydney)
Australian television personalities
Australian radio presenters
Chatswood, New South Wales